Amisk River is a river in east-central Alberta located in the basin of the Beaver River. The Amisk River forms at Amisk Lake and travels in a south-east direction, flowing through the Buffalo Lake and Kikino Metis settlements before being bridged by Highway 36. It joins the Beaver River near Alberta Secondary Highway 866. The Beaver River is a major tributary of the Churchill River, which flows east into Hudson Bay.

Amisk is the Cree name for beaver.

Tributaries
Little Beaver Lake
Cordwood Lake
Whitefish Creek
Drink Lake

See also
List of rivers of Alberta
Hudson Bay drainage basin

References

Rivers of Alberta